Gheorghe Ceaușilă (born 11 October 1966) is a retired Romanian striker.

Honours
Steaua București
Liga I: 1985–86
Universitatea Craiova
Liga I: 1990–91
Cupa României: 1990–91

References

External links

1968 births
Living people
Romanian footballers
Chimia Râmnicu Vâlcea players
FC Steaua București players
FC Olt Scornicești players
AFC Dacia Unirea Brăila players
FC Sportul Studențesc București players
PAOK FC players
FC Dinamo București players
FC Progresul București players
FCV Farul Constanța players
Hapoel Tayibe F.C. players
CSM Unirea Alba Iulia players
ASC Daco-Getica București players
Liga I players
Liga II players
Super League Greece players
Liga Leumit players
Association football forwards
Romanian expatriate footballers
Expatriate footballers in Greece
Expatriate footballers in Israel
Romanian expatriate sportspeople in Greece
Romanian expatriate sportspeople in Israel
Romania international footballers